Luc Roy (born in Quebec, Canada) is a Québécois actor. Luc is the brother of Québécois actors Gildor Roy, Yvon Roy and Maxim Roy, with whom he starred on his first and her second appearance in Coyote.

Filmography 
 Coyote (1992) .... Ringo
 A Hero's Life (La Vie d'un héros) (1994) .... Police militaire
 Diva (unknown episodes, 1997) .... Bernard Lemay
 Life After Love (La Vie après l'amour) (2000) .... Détective Roy
 Lance et Compte: La nouvelle génération (unknown episodes, 2002) .... Assistant de Trottier
 Séraphin: Heart of Stone (Séraphin: un homme et son péché) (2002) .... Jules Pomerleau
 Il Duce canadese (2004) miniseries .... Horse buyer
 Machine Gun Molly (Monica la mitraille) (2004) .... Marcel
 Bon Voyage (2006) miniseries .... Doctor

External links 
 

Year of birth missing (living people)
Living people
Canadian male film actors
Canadian male television actors
Male actors from Quebec